Arne Sverre Birger Krogdahl (25 February 1909 – 10 May 1988) was a Norwegian chess player, Norwegian Chess Championship winner (1937).

Biography
In the begin of 1930s Arne Kroghdahl was one of the leading Norwegian chess players. In 1937, in Trondheim he won the Norwegian Chess Championship. Also he won the Norwegian Blitz Chess Championships many times.

Arne Kroghdahl played for Norway in the Chess Olympiad:
 In 1930, at fourth board in the 3rd Chess Olympiad in Hamburg (+0, =2, -11).

References

External links

Arne Kroghdahl chess games at 365chess.com

1909 births
1988 deaths
Norwegian chess players
Chess Olympiad competitors
20th-century chess players